A sandwich is a food item typically made of two pieces of bread with layers of food between them.

Sandwich may also refer to:

Places and jurisdictions

North America 
 Sandwich, Illinois, U.S.
 Sandwich, Massachusetts, U.S., a town
 Sandwich (CDP), Massachusetts, a village within the town
 Sandwich, New Hampshire, U.S.
 Sandwich Range, a range in the White Mountains
 Sandwich Mountain, a mountain in the Sandwich Range
 Sandwich, Ontario, a historic town, now a neighbourhood of Windsor, Ontario, Canada
 Sandwich, the former Roman Catholic Diocese of Sandwich (now of London, Ontario)
 Sandwich Islands, the former name for the Hawaiian Islands
 Sandwich, the former Apostolic Prefecture of the Sandwich Islands

Elsewhere 
 Sandwich, Kent, England, United Kingdom
 Sandwich Island, former colonial name of Efate, now part of the Shefa Province, Republic of Vanuatu
 Sandwich Island, part of South Georgia and the South Sandwich Islands (British overseas territories)

People 
 Earl of Sandwich, a title held by multiple people

Arts, entertainment, and media

Films 
 Sandwich (2006 film), an Indian Hindi film
 Sandwich (2011 film), an Indian Malayalam film

Music 
 Sandwich (band), Filipino rock band
 Sandwich (album), an album by the metal band Psychostick
 "Sandwiches" (song), a song by Detroit Grand Pubahs from the album Funk All Y'all

Mathematics 
 Ham sandwich theorem
 Huber–White standard error, also called the "sandwich standard error"
 Sandwich theorem

Science 
 Sandwich assay, a type of immunoassay
 Sandwich compounds in chemistry

Other uses 
 Sandwich (horse) (born 1928), Thoroughbred racehorse
 Sandwich (Urbanna, Virginia), U.S., a historic house
 Sandwich, a specific form of a threesome sex position
 HMS Sandwich, the name of six ships of the Royal Navy, and one planned one
 Sandwich generation
 Sandwich printing, a photographic technique for combining multiple images into a single image
 Sandwich structured composite, a layered material

See also 
 Sandwich man (disambiguation)
 Sandwick (disambiguation)